Labeo luluae is fish in genus Labeo which has only been recorded from the Lulua River and the Aruwimi River in the Congo Basin.

References 

Labeo
Cyprinid fish of Africa
Taxa named by Henry Weed Fowler
Fish described in 1930
Endemic fauna of the Democratic Republic of the Congo